Passi is a surname. In India, it is used by the Punjabi Khatris and the Pasi community. It is also a surname used by people from the Torres Strait Islands in Australia. Notable individuals with this surname are listed below.

Bryan Passi, French footballer
Charles Passi, Australian actor
Franck Passi, French footballer
Gérald Passi (born 1964), French footballer
Inder Bir Singh Passi, Indian mathematician	
Kamal Passi (born 1992), Indian cricketer
Luca Passi, Italian priest
Miguel Passi, Argentine cyclist
Nitin Passi, British businessman
Passi, French hip hop artist
Pierre Passi, Congolese politician and diplomat
Poey Passi, Australian Anglican priest
Shalini Passi, Indian arts patron
Sumeet Passi, Indian association footballer

See also
Pasi (surname)

Indian surnames
Punjabi-language surnames
Surnames of Indian origin
Hindu surnames
Khatri clans
Khatri surnames